Jeremy Beale and Marc Polmans were the defending champions but only Polmans chose to defend his title, partnering Evan King. Polmans lost in the first round to Marcelo Tomás Barrios Vera and Alejandro Tabilo.

Max Purcell and Luke Saville won the title after defeating Brydan Klein and Scott Puodziunas 6–7(2–7), 6–3, [10–4] in the final.

Seeds

Draw

References

External links
 Main draw

Latrobe City Traralgon ATP Challenger - Doubles
2019 Doubles